Roy Marlon Baker (November 6, 1901 – June 18, 1961) was a professional American football player in the National Football League and the first American Football League. Over the span of his career, Baker played for the Chicago Cardinals, New York Yankees, Green Bay Packers, Staten Island Stapletons of the NFL. Before that played again in 1926 for the Yankees of the AFL. After his NFL career ended he played for the St. Louis Gunners in 1931 and was their coach in 1932.  Baker won an NFL Championship in 1929 with the Green Bay Packers.

Baker was a captain in the U.S. Navy.

References

Additional sources
 

1901 births
1961 deaths
Chicago Cardinals players
Green Bay Packers players
New York Yankees (AFL) players
New York Yankees (NFL) players
St. Louis Gunners coaches
St. Louis Gunners players
Staten Island Stapletons players
Santa Clara Broncos football players
USC Trojans football players
Sportspeople from Casper, Wyoming
Players of American football from Wyoming
Players of American football from Long Beach, California